= Muhammad al-Nuwayhi =

Egyptian literary scholar

Muhammad al-Nuwayhi (1917-1980) was an Egyptian literary scholar. He was Professor of Arabic literature at Cairo University.

Muhammad al-Nuwayhi was a student of Muhammad Khalaf Allah.

Al-Nuwayhi argued that Islam, properly understood, was a progressive religion compatible with modernity. Its distortion into fundamentalism had been caused by a special class of people monopolizing the interpretation of religion and inappropriately turning religious sources into timeless regulations.
